The CRM-Fields-PIMS Prize is the premier Canadian research prize in the mathematical sciences. It is awarded in recognition of exceptional research achievement in the mathematical sciences and is given annually by three Canadian mathematics institutes: the Centre de Recherches Mathématiques (CRM), the Fields Institute, and the Pacific Institute for the Mathematical Sciences (PIMS).

The prize was established in 1994 by the CRM and the Fields Institute as the CRM-Fields Prize. The prize took its current name when PIMS became a partner in 2005.

The prize carries a monetary award of $10,000, funded jointly by the three institutes. The inaugural prize winner was H.S.M. Coxeter.

Winners
Source: Centre de recherches mathématiques 

1995 – H. S. M. Coxeter
1996 – George A. Elliott
1997 – James Arthur
1998 – Robert V. Moody
1999 – Stephen A. Cook
2000 – Israel Michael Sigal
2001 – William T. Tutte
2002 – John B. Friedlander
2003 – John McKay and Edwin Perkins
2004 – Donald Dawson
2005 – David Boyd
2006 – Nicole Tomczak-Jaegermann
2007 – Joel S. Feldman
2008 – Allan Borodin
2009 – Martin T. Barlow
2010 – Gordon Slade
2011 – Mark A. Lewis
2012 – Stevo Todorčević
2013 – Bruce Reed
2014 – Niky Kamran
2015 – Kai Behrend
2016 – Daniel Wise
2017 – Henri Darmon
2018 – Jeremy Quastel
2019 – Nassif Ghoussoub
2020 – Catherine Sulem
2021 – Andrew Granville
2022 – Bálint Virág
2023 – Christian Genest

See also

 List of mathematics awards

References

External links
CRM-Fields-PIMS Prize Nominations (Fields Institute site)
CRM-Fields-PIMS Prize (CRM site)
CRM-Fields-PIMS Prize Details | Pacific Institute for the Mathematical Sciences – PIMS

Canadian science and technology awards
Mathematics awards
Awards established in 1994
1994 establishments in Canada